Fargodome is an indoor athletic stadium in the north central United States, located on the campus of North Dakota State University (NDSU) in Fargo, North Dakota. Opened  in late 1992, the facility is owned by the City of Fargo and built on university land. Not an actual dome, its seating capacity is 18,700 for football and over 25,000 for full arena concerts.

Fargodome is the home field of the Bison football team, which competes in the National Collegiate Athletic Association (NCAA) at the Division I level in the Football Championship Subdivision (FCS). NDSU is a member of the Missouri Valley Football Conference, and prior to the 1993 season, the football venue was Dacotah Field, adjacent to the south. The stadium also hosts the university's commencement ceremonies as well as many large concerts, other sporting events, and trade shows.

History 

The building was originally planned to be modeled on the Tacoma Dome and have an inflatable roof.  However, as the design evolved, it was decided to have a fixed hard roof, although the dome name stuck.

 November 1987: Fargo Parks Superintendent Bob Johnson and City Council President Ranen Nicholson proposed a plan for convention and athletic facilities in Fargo.
 January 1988: Proposed plan was modified to include a single stadium to be built on North Dakota State University land, that would be financed in part by a half-cent sales tax.
 December 1988: Voters approved half-cent sales tax
 April 1989: Architects hired and construction process begins
 December 1992: Fargodome opens
 January 1994: Hosts Snow Bowl NCAA Division II football all-star game between 1994 and 2000
 December 2002: Fargodome celebrates its 10th anniversary
 December 2006: Initial talks underway to attach a 6,000–9,000-seat stadium to the Fargodome, for use as a basketball arena for the North Dakota State University basketball teams, as well as smaller performances.
 March 2009: The Fargodome is used for the filling and storage of sandbags during the flood.
 August 31, 2012: The newly installed AstroTurf, funded by a $1 million donation from Gate City Bank and Fargodome reserve funds for total cost of $2.9 million, premiered in the North Dakota State Bison football team's first game of the season against Robert Morris. Gate City Bank’s donation led to renaming of the field after the company.
 October 10, 2012: The Fargodome hosted a preseason NBA game between the Indiana Pacers and Minnesota Timberwolves. The Timberwolves won the game 84–70.
 August 2016: Replaced 4 older corner video boards with new HD boards, and added 2 new large (100'x30') Video Screens at a cost of $7.7 million.
 July 2022: Replaced the older version AstroTurf with a new version, funded by the Fargodome's reserve funds for a total price of $1.1 million, which also includes upgrades to the Magic Carpet system that rolls out the turf onto the stadium floor.

Events and acts 
The Fargodome has held events such as the Ringling Bros. and Barnum & Bailey Circus, USHRA's Monster Jam, Rib Fest, World Wrestling Entertainment, World Championship Wrestling, and other local, regional, and national events. The facility briefly played host to the Fargo Freeze Indoor Football League team in 2000, though the team played just one season.

College wrestling 
The Asics/Vaughan Cadet and Junior National Wrestling Championships (freestyle, Greco-Roman wrestling) takes place every year in the Fargodome in the month of July.

Entertainment 
Many famous acts have played the Fargodome including Elton John, Katy Perry, Cher, Guns N' Roses, Fleetwood Mac, Journey, The Rolling Stones, Pearl Jam, Garth Brooks, Bon Jovi, Van Halen, Shania Twain, Taylor Swift, AC/DC, Paul McCartney, Kenny Chesney, Carrie Underwood, Aerosmith, Poison, Nsync, Neil Diamond, Billy Joel, Kiss, Beach Boys, Faith Hill, Bryan Adams, Ozzy Osbourne, Luke Bryan, Pink, Reba McEntire, Dixie Chicks, Lady Antebellum, Bruce Springsteen, Tim McGraw, Def Leppard, Metallica, Prince, Justin Timberlake, Mötley Crüe and many others. The Fargodome is also capable of hosting events on ice such as Disney on Ice, and traveling broadway.

Gate City Bank Theater 
The Fargodome's Gate City Bank Theater is home to theatrical productions, produced locally and touring.

Expansion and renovations 

The Fargodome is currently studying an expansion of its permanent seating. The current capacity is 18,700 with an additional 100 seats to be added during the winter 2015. The addition of 5,000 to 7,500 seats has been discussed since 2011, but is now being seriously considered after several straight years of sold out NDSU Bison football games. That would bring the total capacity for football games to around 25,000. The additional seating would require major structural changes to the dome, including moving the press boxes from the east side to the west side. The west side has been reinforced and could handle extra levels, whereas the east side has a lobby that was not designed to bear any extra load.

In summer 2016, the stadium video boards were replaced with 12 new interior displays featuring SMD LED technology including two large 30'x100' High Definition video/scoreboards on each endzone, 12'x24' screens behind those large screens for those seated behind the board, and four large 20'x22' High Definition video boards (one in each corner), the $7.7 million project also provided for four ribbon displays on the seating fascia 3' high and 33' long along with a portable 15' x 25' screen which can be moved around on gameday, the project also renovated the electronics room and provided for new computer and graphics technology. These screens replaced the 6 old boards installed in 2002. The contract also provided for an increase from 3 to 5 High Definition cameras for additional angles, one of the cameras has a 55x extra zoom for close up play.

In the summer of 2022, the stadium replaced its aging AstroTurf with a newer version. It cost the Fargodome $1.1 million, which it paid for using the stadium reserve funds, that also included upgrades to the Magic Carpet system that rolls out the turf onto the stadium floor.

Crowd noise 

In 2011, the Fargodome was ranked as the 49th best stadium in college football by BleacherReport.com. The article states There aren't many indoor venues in college football, but the few that do exist at the non-FBS level are very unfriendly to any visiting team. That effect is only amplified in a playoff atmosphere. The Fargodome is routinely ranked as one of the loudest college football stadiums in the country. On December 14, 2012, The Forum of Fargo-Moorhead measured the Fargodome crowd noise from the press box during an FCS playoff semifinal game between North Dakota State and Georgia Southern. According to The Forum, the maximum crowd noise exceeded 111 decibels, and the decibel meter consistently read 102–106 during the game. During a 2013 playoff game between North Dakota State and Furman, the crowd noise was measured at 115 decibels.

See also 
 List of NCAA Division I FCS football stadiums

References

External links 
 

College football venues
Covered stadiums in the United States
North Dakota State Bison football
Buildings and structures in Fargo, North Dakota
Tourist attractions in Fargo, North Dakota
American football venues in North Dakota
Convention centers in North Dakota
Concert halls in the United States
1992 establishments in North Dakota
Sports venues completed in 1992
Music venues completed in 1992
Continental Basketball Association venues
Basketball venues in North Dakota